Miriam Zolan is an American biologist, currently at Indiana University and an Elected Fellow of the American Association for the Advancement of Science.

References

Year of birth missing (living people)
Living people
Fellows of the American Association for the Advancement of Science
21st-century American biologists
Stanford University alumni
Indiana University faculty